Sir John Ross  (24 June 1777 – 30 August 1856) was a Scottish Royal Navy officer and polar explorer. He was the uncle of Sir James Clark Ross, who explored the Arctic with him, and later led expeditions to Antarctica.

Biography

Early life 
His family home was on the shore of Loch Ryan, at Stranraer.

Naval career 
It soon sailed to the Mediterranean Sea, where it remained until 1789. He then served aboard  for several months before a transfer to the merchant marine for eight years. In September 1799 he was recalled to the Navy and appointed midshipman on HMS Weazel, which shortly joined in the Anglo-Russian invasion of Holland.

From 1803, he served on various vessels; mainly with the Baltic station. During his service, Ross was wounded several times, the most severe of these being in 1806 when boarding a Spanish vessel; he received wounds inflicted by a sabre and bayonet, and also suffered broken legs and a broken arm. In late 1808, Ross was seconded to the Swedish Navy. In 1812, he was promoted to commander.

Arctic expeditions

1818: First Arctic expedition 
In 1818, Ross received the command of an Arctic expedition organised by the British Admiralty, the first of a new series of attempts to solve the question of a North West Passage. This entailed going around the extreme north-east coast of America and sailing to the Bering Strait. He was also to note the currents, tides, the state of ice and magnetism and to collect specimens he found on the way.

Ross sailed anti-clockwise around Baffin Bay repeating the observations made by William Baffin two hundred years before. In August, he entered Lancaster Sound at the north end of Baffin Island; this later proved to be the eastern gate of the Northwest Passage. He sailed a number of miles west but went no further, for he was misled by a mirage that appeared to show mountains at the end of the strait. He named the apparent mountains "Croker Mountains", in honour of John Wilson Croker, then first secretary of the Admiralty. He then returned to England despite the protests of several of his officers, including Parry and Edward Sabine, who thought he should have more thoroughly examined the "mountains".

The account of his voyage published a year later, brought to light their disagreement, and the ensuing controversy over the existence of Croker Mountains ruined his reputation. This expedition failed to discover much that was new. Its main effect was to open a route for whale ships to the northern Baffin Bay and provoke Parry to re-explore Lancaster Sound and find a major portion of the North West Passage. Ross attained the rank of captain on his return to Scotland, and about this time built the house North West Castle, in Stranraer, south-west Scotland.

1829: Second Arctic expedition 

Partly to redeem his reputation, Ross proposed to use a shallow-draft steamship to break through the ice. The Admiralty was not interested, but he was able to convince the gin-magnate Felix Booth to finance this second Arctic expedition, which began in 1829. His ship was the Victory, a side-wheel steamer with paddles that could be lifted away from the ice and an experimental high-pressure boiler built by John Ericsson. The Victory had been built in 1826 and previously had served as a ferry between Liverpool and the Isle of Man. The engine caused trouble and during the first winter, it was dumped on the shore. The ship carried four officers – John Ross, James Clark Ross, William Thom, surgeon George McDiarmid – and 19 men. The goal was Prince Regent Inlet at the west end of Baffin Island where Parry had lost his ship, the Fury, in 1825.

Ross left the Thames on 23 May 1829. Baffin Bay was unusually ice-free and on 6 August, he passed the point where he had turned back 10 years before. On 11 August, he turned south into Prince Regent Inlet, and on 13 August, reached Fury Beach, where Parry had abandoned his ship. The hulk was gone but there were heaps of stores on the beach, some of which he took. He took winter quarters at Felix Harbour at the eastern tip of the Boothia Peninsula. In January 1830, a group of Netsilik Inuit arrived and provided food and information. For one of them, the ship's carpenter made a wooden leg.

In the spring of 1830, James Clark Ross made several trips west into the interior. On 9 April, he reached the west side of the Boothia Peninsula and in May crossed over ice to the north west shore of King William Island, assuming it was part of the mainland. It was mid-September before the ice broke part of its grip. The crew sawed through the shore ice and warped the ship into open water, but it was soon caught in the ice. October was spent warping and sawing the ship into Sheriff Bay where they spent their second winter only  from Felix Harbour. No Inuit arrived until the following April 1831. James Clark Ross crossed the Boothia Peninsula, and, on 1 June 1831, became the first European to reach the North Magnetic Pole. In August, the ship began to move but only managed to travel  before it got trapped in Victoria Harbour. By January 1832, it was clear that the ship would never get out. Ross's plan was to drag the ship's boats north to Fury Beach, collect provisions there, find open water and hope to be rescued by a whaler.

They left Victory on 29 May 1832. Ten days later, James Clark Ross returned from Fury Beach and reported that Furys boats were repairable, which spared them the labour of dragging the boats. They reached Fury Beach on 1 July, left in three boats on 1 August, and reached Barrow Strait at the end of August. Finding an unbroken field of ice, they waited four weeks for the ice to melt, gave up, returned south, left their boats at Batty Bay, and walked to Fury Beach. On 8 July 1833, they left for Batty Bay and on 14 August, saw open water for the first time. They left the next day and reached the head of Prince Regent Inlet. On 26 August, they spotted a ship but it passed by. A few hours later, they were seen by another ship, which turned out to be Isabella which he had commanded in 1819. Had it not been for his 1819 discovery there would have been no whalers in the area. By October they were back in England.

The expedition had cost three lives. Ross was presented to the King and given a knighthood. The crew were given double pay for the entire four years by the Admiralty even though they were not in the Royal Navy. This impressive experience, as well as the scientific and ethnological information gathered by Ross's team, brought him the renown that he had long sought. In comparison with other contemporary arctic explorers, this was a feat of heroic proportions and was probably due to the fact that Ross befriended and learned from the Inuit.

Once again, however, Ross encountered controversy with his cartography. In 1830, during the expedition, James Clark Ross had charted three islands in James Ross Strait and named them the Beaufort Islands. John Ross never saw the islands. Later, back in England, John Ross, using his authority as expedition leader, renamed the islands as the Clarence Islands, and even added a number of fictional islands to the group, in an apparent attempt to impress the new king, William IV. In 1833, Ross received the Royal Premium from the Royal Geographical Society and a gold medal from the French geographical society, and various foreign orders, including Knight of the Royal Order of the Polar Star of Sweden, and in the following year, received a knighthood and was appointed a Companion of the Order of the Bath in Britain. He was as British consul at Stockholm in 1839, and remained at this post until 1846.

1850: Final Arctic expedition 

In 1850, at the age of 72, Ross undertook a third voyage to the Arctic regions, this time in search of the expedition party of Sir John Franklin which had not been heard from for four years. With financial support from HBC, he sailed a private vessel, the schooner Felix, to Lancaster Sound. His vessel was not particularly robust and other ships in the area had to provide food to help Ross combat scurvy which had set in amongst his crew.

Failing to find Franklin or any of his men, Ross returned to England in October 1851 by way of Greenland, where he encountered rumours that Franklin and his party were all dead. Although most people disregarded these, Ross stood by them.

Later life 
While he had been searching for Franklin, Ross was promoted to rear admiral. Retiring to Stranraer, Scotland, he never sailed again. His knowledge of the Swedish and Danish languages saw him consulting for the government about the Baltic regions as tensions with Russia increased and his later years were spent writing. He published several pamphlets, including one critical of the efforts to rescue Franklin.

He also futilely hoped for a reconciliation with his wife and pestered the Admiralty on various matters, one being the quality of its maps. He died on  while visiting London, where he is buried at Kensal Green Cemetery.

Publications

Footnotes

References 
 
 

 
 
 

Attribution

Further reading

External links 

 
 
 
 
 

19th-century explorers
19th-century Scottish people
1777 births
1856 deaths
Burials at Kensal Green Cemetery
English explorers of North America
Explorers of Canada
Explorers of the Arctic
Knights of the Order of the Polar Star
People from Dumfries and Galloway
People from Stranraer
Persons of National Historic Significance (Canada)
Royal Navy admirals
Scottish admirals
Scottish expatriates in Sweden
Scottish knights
Scottish mercenaries
Scottish polar explorers
Royal Navy personnel of the Napoleonic Wars
Recipients of the Royal Geographical Society Founder's Medal